Drancy is an RER station in Drancy, a northern suburb of Paris, in Seine-Saint-Denis department, France. The station is in Zone 3 of the Carte orange. It is situated on the RER B suburban railway line.

External links

 

Railway stations in France opened in 1919
Railway stations in Seine-Saint-Denis
Réseau Express Régional stations